
Laguna Azul (Spanish for "blue lake" or "blue lagoon") is a lake in the Beni Department, Bolivia. Its surface area is 6.1 km².

Lakes of Beni Department